The Black Panther was the official newspaper of the Black Panther Party. It began as a four-page newsletter in Oakland, California, in 1967, and was founded by Huey P. Newton and Bobby Seale.  It was the main publication of the party and was soon sold in several large cities across the United States, as well as having an international readership. The newspaper distributed information about the party's activities, and expressed through articles the ideology of the Black Panther Party, focusing on both international revolutions as inspiration and contemporary racial struggles of African Americans across the United States.

Foundation 
The Black Panther Party maintained a commitment to community service, including various "survival programs" developed by individual chapters that, by 1969, became part of the national party's "serve the people program" to connect their commitments to basic social services with community organizing and consciousness raising.  The Black Panther Party's Intercommunal News Service published The Black Panther Party Newspaper as a critical part of its consciousness raising program.

The Black Panther Party Newspaper, also known as The Black Panther Intercommunal News Service, Black Panther Black Community News Service, and Black Community News Service, was published by the Black Panther Party from April 25, 1967, to September 16, 1980. The newspaper was most popular from 1968 to 1972, and during this time, sold a hundred thousand copies a week.

An undergraduate student at San Francisco State, Judy Juanita, served as editor of The Black Panther Party Newspaper during the later 1960s.  In 1969, two-thirds of Black Panther Party members were women.

Emory Douglas, who studied at the City College of San Francisco, acted as the newspaper’s graphic arts designer. Working alongside Douglas were Gayle Asali Dickson and Joan Tarika Lewis, who was the first woman to join the Black Panther Party.

In its later years, the newspaper was used to rally support for members of the party who became political prisoners.

Format 
"The BPP newspaper grew from a four-page newsletter to a full newspaper in about a year and [537] issues were printed".

Circulation 
Circulation was national and international.  From 1968 to 1971, The Black Panther Party Newspaper was the most widely read Black newspaper in the United States, with a weekly circulation of more than 300,000.  It sold for 25 cents.  Every Panther was required to read and study the newspaper before they could sell it.  As it became nationally circulated, The Black Panther Party Newspaper national distribution center was located in San Francisco, with a distribution team led by Andrew Austin, Sam Napier, and Ellis White.  Other distribution centers were in Chicago, Kansas, Los Angeles, New York, and Seattle.

See also
 List of underground newspapers of the 1960s counterculture

References

Further reading  

 Charles Evens Inniss Memorial Library Archives. The Black Panther Newspapers and Posters – Collection History and Scope. Medgar Evers College, CUNY, November 2013. Web. February 25, 2017. This online exhibit displays digitized issues of the newspaper The Black Panther Intercommunal News Service from 1969 to 1973 and the party’s propaganda posters.
 African-American Involvement in the Vietnam War, Document collection: Congress. Staff Study by the Committee on Internal Security – House of Representatives. The Black Panther Party Its Origin and Development as Reflected In Its Official Weekly Newspaper The Black Panther Black Community News Service. Washington, D.C.: GPO, 1970.

External links
 

1967 establishments in California
1980 disestablishments in California
Black Panther Party
Defunct African-American newspapers
Defunct newspapers published in California
Newspapers published in the San Francisco Bay Area
Newspapers established in 1967
Publications disestablished in 1980
Socialist newspapers published in the United States